The Jerry Yeagley Award (Jerry Yeagley Award for Exceptional Personal Service Award) is an award given to a former college soccer player, either men's or women's, that has demonstrated exceptional personal achievements either on or off the soccer field.

The award was first awarded in 2005 to Don Rawson, who was then the Indiana Soccer Association president, and a former player for the Indiana Hoosiers men's soccer program in the late 1960s and early 1970s.

The award is named for Jerry Yeagley, who formerly coached the Indiana Hoosiers soccer program.

Past winners 
 2022 - Kristin Acquavella, Director, Logistics, Fleet Supply and Ordnance, United States Navy
 2020 - Raymon Gaddis, Philadelphia Union coaching staff
 2019 - Ann Murphy, Kansas City, Mo. Police Department/Youth RISE KC/Saint Louis University
 2018 - William Smith, Monrovia Football Academy/LEAD Africa/William & Mary
 2017 - Nicole Aunapu Mann, NASA/U.S. Naval Academy
 2016 - Angela Hucles, United States Women's National Team/Empowerment Through Sport
 2015 - Mark Spiegel, Make Your Own Ball Day
 2014 - Ben Gucciardi, Soccer Without Borders
 2013 - Lorrie Fair, United States Women's National Team
 2012 - Heather Walls, Centre College (Ky.) 
 2011 - Mary McVeigh, Dartmouth College
 2010 - Diego Gutierrez, Philadelphia Union
 2009 - Lauren Gregg, United States Women's National Team
 2008 - Curtis Pride, Gallaudet University
 2007 - Hugo Salcedo, U.S. Soccer
 2006 - Derek Arneaud, East Stroudsburg University
 2005 - Don Rawson, Indiana Soccer Association

See also

 List of sports awards honoring women

References

External links 
 Jerry Yeagley Award

Awards established in 2005
Association football trophies and awards
College soccer trophies and awards in the United States
Women's association football trophies and awards